YCP may refer to:

 YaST Control Programming Language
 York College of Pennsylvania, a private college located in York, Pennsylvania, United States
 Young China Party, a political party in Taiwan
 YSR Congress Party, a political party in India